Bactris pickelii is a species of flowering plant in the family Arecaceae. It is found only in Brazil. It is threatened by habitat loss.

References

pickelii
Flora of Brazil
Vulnerable plants
Taxonomy articles created by Polbot
Taxa named by Max Burret